Spathosterninae is a subfamily of grasshoppers, based on the genus Spathosternum. Within the monotypic tribe Spathosternini there are currently 3 genera and about 12 described species recorded from Africa, the Indian subcontinent, south-east Asia and north-east Australia.

Genera
These three genera belong to the subfamily Spathosterninae:
 Laxabilla Sjöstedt, 1934 - Australia
 Paraspathosternum Ramme, 1929 - E. Africa, Madagascar
 Spathosternum Krauss, 1877 - as above

References

External links
 

Acrididae
Orthoptera of Africa
Orthoptera of Asia